"You've Got A Lot To Answer For" is a song written by Cerys Matthews and Mark Roberts and recorded by Welsh rock band Catatonia.  Taken from their debut album, Way Beyond Blue, it became the band's first Top 40 hit, peaking at no. 35, largely in part due to a campaign started by BBC Radio 1 DJs Mark and Lard.

The B-side, "Do You Believe In Me?", became a huge fan favourite live and has been said to document the break-up of Cerys Matthews and guitarist Mark Roberts' relationship.

References

Catatonia (band) songs
1996 songs
Songs written by Cerys Matthews
Songs written by Mark Roberts (singer)
Blanco y Negro Records singles